Germany participated in the Eurovision Song Contest 2018. The German entry was selected through the national final Unser Lied für Lissabon, organised by the German broadcaster Norddeutscher Rundfunk (NDR). Michael Schulte won the national final with the song "You Let Me Walk Alone".

As a member of the "Big Five", Germany automatically qualified to compete in the final of the Eurovision Song Contest.

Background 

Germany has won the contest on two occasions: in 1982 with the song "Ein bißchen Frieden" performed by Nicole and in 2010 with the song "Satellite" performed by Lena. Germany, to this point, has been noted for having competed in the contest more than any other country; they have competed in every contest since the first edition in 1956 except for the 1996 contest when the nation was eliminated in a pre-contest elimination round. In 2017, the German entry "Perfect Life" performed by Levina placed second-to-last out of twenty-six competing songs with six points.

The German national broadcaster, ARD, broadcasts the event within Germany and delegates the selection of the nation's entry to the regional broadcaster Norddeutscher Rundfunk (NDR). NDR confirmed that Germany would participate in the 2018 Eurovision Song Contest on 16 May 2017. From 2013 to 2016, multi-artist national finals had determined both the songs and performers to compete at Eurovision for Germany. In 2017, the broadcaster reverted to a casting show format for the national final, similar to the format previously used in 2010 and 2012. For their 2018 entry, ARD announced on 8 June 2017 that the broadcaster would organise a national final with a new selection format.

Before Eurovision

Unser Lied für Lissabon 
Unser Lied für Lissabon (English: Our Song for Lisbon) was the competition that selected Germany's entry for the Eurovision Song Contest 2018. The competition took place on 22 February 2018 at the Studio Berlin Adlershof in Berlin, hosted by Linda Zervakis and Elton. Collaboration with the production company Brainpool terminated after seven years. Six acts competed during the show with the winner being selected through a combination of votes from a 100-member Eurovision panel, a twenty-member international expert jury panel and public voting. The show was broadcast on Das Erste and One as well as online via the broadcaster's Eurovision Song Contest website eurovision.de. The national final was watched by 3.17 million viewers in Germany.

Competing entries 
Interested artists were able to apply for the competition by submitting an application between 27 October 2017 and 6 November 2017. By the end of the process, it was announced that over 4,000 applications were received by NDR and an expert panel narrowed the total number of applicants to 211 artists. Seventeen candidates were selected by the 100-member Eurovision panel, who went through a workshop organised by NDR where they received vocal coaching and choreography training and the six competing acts were selected through a 50/50 combination of votes from the twenty-member international jury panel and the Eurovision panel. The six participating acts were announced on 29 December 2017. In January 2018, the competing acts worked with fifteen national and international songwriters, composers and producers in a three-day songwriting camp in order to create new songs or edit existing songs for the national final.

Final 
The televised final took place on 22 February 2018. The winner, "You Let Me Walk Alone" performed by Michael Schulte, was selected through a combination of votes from a 100-member Eurovision panel (1/3), a twenty-member international jury panel (1/3) and public voting (1/3), including options for landline and SMS voting. The international jury panel consisted of members who had been national juries for their respective countries at the Eurovision Song Contest, while the Eurovision panel consisted of German television viewers selected in cooperation with Simon-Kucher & Partners and Digame through surveys on social media in order to reflect the taste of the wider European audience. In addition to the performances of the competing entries, German singer Mike Singer performed his single "Deja Vu". 427,519 votes were cast in the final.

At Eurovision 
The Eurovision Song Contest 2018 took place at the Altice Arena in Lisbon, Portugal and consisted of two semi-finals on 8 and 10 May and the final on 12 May 2018. According to Eurovision rules, all nations with the exceptions of the host country and the "Big Five" (France, Germany, Italy, Spain and the United Kingdom) are required to qualify from one of two semi-finals in order to compete for the final; the top ten countries from each semi-final progress to the final. As a member of the "Big Five", Germany automatically qualifies to compete in the final. In addition to their participation in the final, Germany is also required to broadcast and vote in one of the two semi-finals.

Voting

Points awarded to Germany

Points awarded by Germany

Detailed voting results
The following members comprised the German jury:
 Mary Roos (jury chairperson)singer, represented Germany in the 1972 and 1984 contests
 Max Giesingersinger-songwriter
 Sascha Stadlerartist manager
 Mike Singersinger-songwriter
  (Lotte)singer-songwriter

References

External links
 Official ARD Eurovision site

2018
Countries in the Eurovision Song Contest 2018
Eurovision
Eurovision